The Regional Institute of Ophthalmology, Thiruvananthapuram is the highest government level referral hospital in the field of ophthalmology in Kerala state. As of 2021, it is the only Regional Institute of Ophthalmology in Kerala. The hospital is located near the General Hospital at Red Cross Road in Thiruvananthapuram city. Sunayanam, the first mobile eye hospital in Kerala operates under  Thiruvananthapuram Regional Institute of Ophthalmology.

Daily about 600 people are consulted as referrals, and about 200 people come in directly for treatment without a referral.

History
The hospital was established as Government Eye Hospital in 1905, during the reign of king Sree Moolam Thirunal of Travancore. With the establishment of the Thiruvananthapuram Medical College in 1951, it became the ophthalmology department of the Medical College. In 1995, the hospital was separated from Medical college and upgraded to the Regional Institute of Ophthalmology, an autonomous institution.

Courses offered
 Post graduate degree in ophthalmology
 Bachelor's degree in optometry

Development
The new Specialty Block of the Regional Institute of Ophthalmology, Thiruvananthapuram was inaugurated in February 2019.

Punarjyothi
On 13 February 2019, Kerala government and the RIO Trivandrum Alumni Association jointly started a rehabilitation center for visually challenged patients under the Punarjyothi project.

References

Hospitals in Thiruvananthapuram
Eye hospitals in India